Maksim Borisovich Barsov (born 29 April 1993) is a Russian football centre-forward who plays for FC Neftekhimik Nizhnekamsk.

Club career
He made his debut in the Russian Second Division for FC Volga Ulyanovsk on 2 August 2012 in a game against FC Spartak Yoshkar-Ola.

He made his Russian Football National League debut for FC Gazovik Orenburg on 16 March 2014 in a game against FC Sibir Novosibirsk.

He made his Russian Premier League debut for PFC Sochi on 27 February 2021 in a game against FC Arsenal Tula. On 19 February 2022, Barsov was loaned to FC Baltika Kaliningrad until the end of the season. On 1 September 2022, Barsov was released by Sochi.

Honours
 Russian Professional Football League Zone West top scorer: 2016–17.

Career statistics

Club

References

External links
 
 

1993 births
Sportspeople from Tver
Living people
Russian footballers
Russia youth international footballers
Association football forwards
FC Lokomotiv Moscow players
FC Volga Ulyanovsk players
FC Orenburg players
FC KAMAZ Naberezhnye Chelny players
FC Solyaris Moscow players
FC Dynamo Saint Petersburg players
PFC Sochi players
FC Baltika Kaliningrad players
FC Neftekhimik Nizhnekamsk players
Russian Premier League players
Russian First League players
Russian Second League players